Danny Yong (born 1972) is a Singaporean hedge fund manager. He is the Chief Investment Officer and founding partner of  Dymon Asia Capital, an Asia-focused alternative investment management firm based in Singapore.

Career
Yong has over 23 years of experience trading FX, fixed income and equity futures in Asia. Prior to founding Dymon Asia, he was a founding partner and Chief Investment Officer of Abax Global Capital, a hedge fund based in Hong Kong. Previously a Managing Director at Citadel Investment Asia, he established and ran the Asia Macro trading business from 2005 to 2007. Prior to Citadel, he was Head of Trading for South East Asian FX and Derivatives at Goldman Sachs, where he spent almost six years in its Hong Kong and Tokyo offices. Danny started his trading career at JP Morgan in 1997 as a FX currency and interest rates derivatives trader.

Personal life
Mr. Yong's father died when he was 10 years old. In 1992, Yong was serving his military service, becoming operations officer of the 24th Battalion of the Singapore Artillery. After serving in the military, he achieved first class honors in business and finance at Singapore's Nanyang Technological University.

References

1972 births
Living people